The Siege at Ruby Ridge is a 1996 drama television film directed by Roger Young and written by Lionel Chetwynd about the confrontation between the family of Randy Weaver and the US federal government at Ruby Ridge in 1992. It was based on the book Every Knee Shall Bow by reporter Jess Walter. It originally aired as a two-part CBS miniseries entitled Ruby Ridge: An American Tragedy on May 19 and May 21, 1996. The miniseries was edited together to become the film The Siege at Ruby Ridge.

Cast

 Laura Dern as Vicki Weaver
 Randy Quaid as Randy Weaver
 Kirsten Dunst as Sara Weaver
 Darren E. Burrows as Kevin Harris
 G. W. Bailey as Ralph Coulter
 Bradley Pierce as Sammy Weaver
 Gary Graham as Brian Jackson
 August Schellenberg as Indian
 Diane Ladd as Irma Coulter
 Tracy Griffith as Gwen Coulter
 Nicholas Pryor as Bert Yeager
 Hal Landon Jr. as George Mill
 John Dennis Johnston as Tony Vickers
 Robert Harper as Earl Martens
 Lyman Ward as Ross Jones
 Bob Gunton as Bo Gritz
 Joe Don Baker as Gerry Spence

Awards

References

External links
 
 

1996 television films
1996 films
CBS network films
American films based on actual events
Films directed by Roger Young
Films set in 1992
Films set in Idaho
1990s English-language films